The 1948–49 Copa México was the 33rd staging of the Copa México, the 6th staging in the professional era.

The competition started on July 21, 1949, and concluded on August 14, 1949, with the final, in which Club León lifted the trophy for the first time ever with a 3–0 victory over Atlante and won the title of Campeonisimo for winning the league and the cup in the same season.
This edition was played by 15 teams, in a knock-out stage, in a single match.

First round

Played between July 21 and July 24

|}

Bye:  Tampico

Quarterfinals

Played between July 28 and July 31

|}

Semifinals

Played August 7

|}

Final

Played August 15

|}

References
Mexico - Statistics of Copa México in season 1948/1949. (RSSSF)

1948-49
1948–49 in Mexican football
1948–49 domestic association football cups